Dakshin Behala is a locality in South West kolkata in Behala area. It is under Kolkata Municipal Corporation and under Kolkata Police Jurisdiction.

Location
Dakshin Behala borders Bakultala to the north and Anandanagar colony H Block to the south.

Administration
The area is under the jurisdiction of Thakurpukur Police Station and Sarsuna Police Station of South West Division (Behala Division) of Kolkata Police.

The area is under 125 and 126 number ward of Kolkata Municipal Corporation.

Transportation

Bus
M7C=Sasthir More - Howrah Station

Auto Rickshaw
Chandra Pally - Silpara
Anandanagar - Thakurpukur
Khudiram Pally - Thakurpukur

References

Neighbourhoods in Kolkata